Associazione Sportiva Dilettantistica Fiammamonza 1970, better known as Fiammamonza, is a women's football team based in Monza, Lombardy, Italy. 

Fiammamonza won the Serie A in 2005–06 and, for a short time (1991–1995), also had a men's team in the Terza Categoria, the only example in Italy of the period. The fiammette represented Italy in the UEFA Women's Cup in 2006–07 , failing to progress past the first qualifying stage. They play their games at the 2,000-capacity Stadio Gino Alfonso Sada.

Honours 
 Serie A 
 Winners (1): 2005–06
 Supercoppa Italiana
 Winners (1): 2006
 Serie B 
 Winners (2): 1979, 1999–2000
 Coppa Italia 
 Runners-up (2): 1990–91, 1991–92
 Serie A2 
 Runners-up (1): 2011–12

European record

See also
 :Category:ASD Fiammamonza 1970 players

References

External links
 

Sport in Monza
1970 establishments in Italy
Association football clubs established in 1970
Football clubs in Lombardy
Women's football clubs in Italy
Serie A (women's football) clubs